Ehari or Ali ) is a village and concejo located in the municipality of Vitoria-Gasteiz, in the Álava province, Basque Country, Spain. The village has been absorbed by the city, and is part of the Ali-Gobeo neighborhood.

References

External links
 

Concejos in Vitoria-Gasteiz